Luiz Ricardo Alves (born 11 January 1994 in Rio de Janeiro), commonly known as Sassá, is a Brazilian footballer who plays as a forward for CSA.

Club career

Botafogo
Sassá made his league debut for Botafogo during the 2012 season.

Career statistics

References

External links

1994 births
Living people
Brazilian footballers
Footballers from Rio de Janeiro (city)
Association football forwards
Campeonato Brasileiro Série A players
Campeonato Brasileiro Série B players
Primeira Liga players
Botafogo de Futebol e Regatas players
Oeste Futebol Clube players
Clube Náutico Capibaribe players
Cruzeiro Esporte Clube players
C.S. Marítimo players
Centro Sportivo Alagoano players